The Spinka financial controversy is a case in which five Spinka charitable organisations under the auspices of Grand Rabbi Naftali Tzvi Weisz, the Spinka Rebbe of Boro Park, as well as Weisz himself, his personal assistant, and five others were charged with various counts of tax fraud and money laundering. Their indictment alleges that the five charities were used to launder money and to avoid payment of tax on taxable income by issuing fraudulent receipts for bogus charitable contributions, and charging fees for transfers of funds. Among those charged are four men from Los Angeles, California and two from Tel Aviv. These include a diamond merchant, a businessman, and an attorney. The five Spinka charitable organizations are Yeshiva Imrei Yosef, Yeshivath Spinka, Central Rabbinical Seminary, Machne Sva Rotzohn, and Mesivta Imrei Yosef Spinka, all based in Brooklyn.

The accusations include receiving up to seven-figure sums in contributions to Spinka charities while secretly promising to refund up to 95% of contributors' donations, thus allowing contributors to then illegally claim tax deductions on money they in fact kept. The scheme allegedly saved the participating donors millions of dollars in federal income taxes. Over the course of ten years, it is alleged that at least $8.7 million in donations were involved, out of which the charities kept nearly $750,000. The rest is said to have been refunded to donors who allegedly claimed bogus donations on their income tax returns.

The case was broken with the help of a secret cooperating witness, a Los Angeles businessman who had contributed $1.7 million to the scheme, when he agreed to turn state's evidence and to secretly record his former colleagues. In 2008, the Jewish Journal of Greater Los Angeles published a detailed report on the case alongside a number of related articles. The article was the paper's cover story and was written by the paper's religion editor, Amy Klein. The Jewish Journal of Greater Los Angeles article revealed from court documents that the FBI informant was a Jewish LA businessman. According to the article, the informant had been wiretapped by the FBI in conversation with Spinka officials negotiating over the percentage of kickback to be kept. According to an affidavit cited in the article, the scam was instigated by the informant's father, a major LA Jewish philanthropist. The article also quoted experts on the Orthodox Jewish world, with Joel Cohen arguing that:

Some have suggested that the informant should be termed a moser— an informant who illegitimately reports the conduct of fellow Jew to a non-Rabbinic authority. The Rabbinical Council of California spokesman commented that the body has discussed the issue but declined to take a position.

Samuel Heilman of City University of New York commented on the controversy in The Forward: "There is a great temptation among these rabbis, who come from a culture that often views the 'government' as in the hands of enemies, to believe that for 'higher' motives is acceptable; in fact, often their temptations are driven by more venal and selfish aims than they might acknowledge."

Weisz and Zigelman appeared in court on December 31, 2007. They spent some of the time studying Hebrew books and reciting Psalms. On July 13, 2009, Rabbi Weisz pleaded guilty to a conspiracy charge and could face up to five years in prison.

On July 28, 2009, an emotional Rabbi Weisz admitted their mistake, apologized, and exhorted others not to follow in his mistakes, at a conference devoted to legality in the Orthodox community. "Things happened that were not supposed to happen," he said. "We have to commit that in the future this will never happen again." The Rabbi also disclosed a legal compliance plan developed in conjunction with a team of lawyers and accountants, to which all Spinka institutions were bound to follow, and which he offered to share freely with all other synagogues, schools and institutions.

See also
 Charity fraud
 Adam Milstein

References

External links
Spinka Tax Scheme
Spinka rabbi arrested for tax fraud 
Spinka Rebbe's Mea Culpa

2007 in law
American white-collar criminals
Hasidic Judaism in New York City
Spinka (Hasidic dynasty)